Rajeswari Vedachalam Government Arts College, is a general degree college located at Anna Nagar, Chengalpattu, Chennai, Tamil Nadu. It was established in the year 1970. The college is affiliated with University of Madras. This college offers different courses in arts, commerce, technology and sciences.

Accreditation
The college is recognized by the University Grants Commission (UGC), New Delhi and affiliated to University of Madras, Chennai. This college is also accredited with B Grade by National Assessment and Accreditation Council, Bangalore.

Courses

UG
 B.A. Tamil
 B.A. English
 B.A. History
 B.A. Political Science
 B. Com.
 B. B. A.
 B. Sc. Physics
 B. Sc. Chemistry
 B. Sc. Mathematics
 B. Sc. Zoology
 B. Sc. Computer Science
 B. C. A.

PG
 M.A. Tamil
 M.A. English
 M.A. History
 M. Com.
 M. Sc. Chemistry
 M. Sc. Mathematics
 M. Sc. Computer Science

Research Degrees

M. Phil.
 M. Phil. Tamil
 M. Phil. English
 M. Phil. History
 M. Phil. Commerce
 M. Phil. Chemistry

Ph.D.
 Ph.D. Tamil
 Ph.D. English
 Ph.D. History
 Ph.D. Commerce
 Ph.D. Chemistry

References

External links
http://www.rvgovtartscollege.com/

Educational institutions established in 1970
1970 establishments in Tamil Nadu
Colleges affiliated to University of Madras
Universities and colleges in Chennai